The French Internet site "Aide à l'Eglise en détresse" (Aid to the Church in Need) puts the figure of Christians in Bhutan at 12,255, with 1,000 Roman Catholics, making it a total of 0.9% of the population. The population also consists of 84% Buddhists, 11.4% Hindus, 3.4% Animists and 0.3% uncategorized.

Origins
In 1627 two Pourtugese Jesuits, Estêvão Cacella and  João Cabral, traveling from Kochi and attempting to make a new route to the Jesuit mission in Shigatse, Tibet, visited Bhutan. While in Bhutan, Father Cacella and Father Cabral met Ngawang Namgyal, the founder and religious leader of the Bhutanese state, and spent months in his court. The "Zhabdrung strongly encouraged the Jesuits to stay and even allowed them to use a room in Cheri [Monastery] as a chapel, granted them land in Paro to build a church and sent some of his own attendants to join the congregation. With no success in conversion and despite much discouragement from the Zhabdrung against their departure, the Jesuits eventually left for Tibet." At the end of a stay of nearly eight months in the country, Father Cacella wrote a long letter from Cheri Monastery, to his superior in Cochin in the Malabar Coast; it was a report, The Relacao, relating the progress of their travels. Their visit is also corroborated in contemporaneous Bhutanese sources, including the biography of Zhabdrung Ngawang Namgyal.

The 2008 Constitution
Article 7 of the 2008 constitution guarantees religious freedom, but also forbids conversion 'by means of coercion or inducement'.  According to Open Doors, this hinders the ability of Christians to convert.

Christian communities
There is a relatively large Christian population in southern Bhutan.

Roman Catholics
Territorially, Roman Catholics in Bhutan belong to the Roman Catholic Diocese of Darjeeling.

Protestants
The majority of the country's Christians are Pentecostals. The Church of God in Christ, which claims to be the denomination supplying most gospel tracts in Bhutan, has a Pentecostal character and has about two congregations in Bhutan. The Indian New Life League is another Protestant denomination and has one congregation in Bhutan. The Diocese of Eastern Himalaya is a diocese of the Church of North India, with its seat at Darjeeling. There are other Protestant groups, like El-Shaddai, and there are also Christians who are not members of the denominational churches, who simply gather as Christians in the name of Jesus Christ. They are called "brethren" and number about 400 in Bhutan.

Vajrayana Buddhism as state religion

Vajrayana Buddhism is the State religion of Bhutan. Bhutan is the last remaining country in which Buddhism in its tantric, vajrayana form, also called lamaism, is the state religion.

Restrictions on the Christian faith

Before 2008
 In 2002 : According to a 2002 report cited by the Bhutanese Christians Services Centre NGO, "the 65,000 Christians [in the country] have only one church at their disposal."
 In 2006 : According to Mission Network News,  "it's illegal for a Buddhist to become a Christian and church buildings are forbidden. (...) Christians in Bhutan are only allowed to practice their faith at home. Those who openly choose to follow Christ can be expelled from Bhutan and stripped of their citizenship."
 In 2007 : According to Gospel for Asia, "the government has recently begun clamping down on Christians by barring some congregations from meeting for worship. This has caused at least two Gospel for Asia-affiliated churches to temporarily close their doors. (...) Under Bhutan law, it is illegal to attempt to convert people from the country’s two predominant religions [Buddhism and Hinduism]."

After 2008
According to the "Open Doors" ONG, "Persecution in Buddhist Bhutan mainly comes from the family, the community, and the monks who yield a strong influence in the society. Cases of atrocities (i.e. beatings) have been decreasing in number; this may continue as a result of major changes in the country, including the implementation of a new constitution guaranteeing greater religious liberty."

Proselytizing
According to the U. S. State Department's 2007 Report on International Religious Freedom no forced religious conversions have been known.

Christian media
The Bhutanese Christians Services Centre is an NGO informing on persecution of Christians in Bhutan. 
 The Gospel for Asia radio broadcasts in five languages reaching Bhutan.

Bible translations

The Dzongkha Bible, translated from the New King James Version, is now available. It comes in the forms of the combined Old/New Testament book, the New Testament only, and the New Testament with Psalms and Proverbs. No Tshangla Bible has been published yet.

References

See also 
 Freedom of religion in Bhutan
 Roman Catholicism in Bhutan
 Persecution of Christians